Klára Chmelová (born August 15, 1995) is a Czech ice hockey player for HC Slavia Praha and the Czech national team.

She participated at the 2017 IIHF Women's World Championship.

References

External links

1995 births
Living people
Czech women's ice hockey forwards
People from Kadaň
Sportspeople from the Ústí nad Labem Region